Simplice Guedet Manzela (died 9 April 2020) was a Gabonese politician. He was a member of the Gabonese Democratic Party (Parti démocratique gabonais, PDG), and was a deputy in the National Assembly of Gabon. He was Secretary-General of the PDG from 1994 until September 2008.

He supported the candidacy of Jean Ping in the Gabonese presidential elections of 2016.

References

Members of the National Assembly of Gabon
Gabonese Democratic Party politicians
2020 deaths
Year of birth missing
21st-century Gabonese people